Wild leek is a common name for several plants in the genus Allium It may refer to:

 Allium ampeloprasum, native to Eurasia, the wild ancestor of cultivated leeks
 Allium tricoccum, native to eastern North America